Rognoni is an Italian surname.

In particular, it can refer to a family of musicians, who also spelled it Rognino, Rogniono, Rognone, Rongione, or Rongioni. They were also called "Taeggio" (or "Taegio") after the presumed place of birth of Riccardo.
 Riccardo Rognoni or Rogniono (c. 1550–1620), Italian violinist and composer
 Francesco Rognoni Taeggio (second half of the 16th century – after 1626), Italian violinist composer, son of Riccardo
 Giovanni Domenico Rognoni Taeggio (2nd half of 16th century – before Oct 1624), Italian organist and composer, son of Riccardo

Others with the surname
 Giorgio Rognoni (1946–1986), Italian professional football player
  (191386), Italian musicologist and critic
 Maria Cecilia Rognoni Potocki, (born 1976), Argentine field hockey defender
 Raymond Rognoni (1892–1965), French actor and comedian
 Virginio Rognoni (1924–2022), Italian politician

Notes

Italian-language surnames